The World Pasty Championships are an annual event held in Cornwall to celebrate the Cornish Pasty and its variants, with entrants from around the world including Australia and the Americas. Awards are given to amateurs, professionals, juniors and companies. Entries in the Cornish pasty category must be made in Cornwall with traditional ingredients and techniques, but far more freedom is allowed in the "open savoury" category.

Background

The pasty originated in the 14th century as a food that miners could take underground.
There is some dispute over whether the first pasties were from Devon, crimped on top, or from Cornwall, crimped on the side.
Since 2011 a pasty must be made in Cornwall to carry the label "Cornish Pasty".
Pasties have been carried to many other parts of the world by Cornish immigrants, some of whom have developed unusual variants.
The World Pasty Championships are an annual event sponsored by the Cornish Pasty Association and held at the Eden Project.
As of 2016 there were categories for Cornish Pastry and for Open Savory broken into Professional, Amateur, Junior (15 and under) and Company sub-categories.

History

The first World Pasty Championships were held on 3 March 2012 at the Eden Project, a park near St Austell, Cornwall.
Entrants came from the UK, US and Australia.
The 102 pasties that were entered were evaluated by a panel of 21 judges based on taste, texture, appearance, crimp and technical expertise. 
The open savoury amateur winner was a pasty with wild rabbit poached in cider-soaked leeks, with peas and lemon zest.

In 2015 the 88-year-old mother of John Lethbridge, a Cornish sea shanty singer with the Fisherman's Friends, won the Cornish Pasty Amateur title.
She had been making pasties since she helped her mother as a child.
Mrs. Lethbridge uses the traditional potatoes, swede and onion, sliced thinly and placed in layers. She always uses beef skirt for the meat.
At the 2015 event an empanada submitted by the miner Jorge Pereira from Chile won the open savoury category.
The traditional Chilean pasty had beef, onion, hard-boiled eggs, olives and sultanas.
Entrants also came from Canada and the US.
The Open Savoury Professional category was won by a smoked haddock, white wine and mustard pasty.
One of the entries was a huge pasty in the shape of half a globe, with the crust showing the oceans, seas and continents.
The  diameter globe was the work of the head chef of the Eden Project.

At the 5th annual championship, held on St Piran's Day 2016, a baker from Canada, won the Pasty Ambassador prize.
Matt Grant originated in England, where his mother taught him how to make a pasty.
He now runs a pasty company in Arnprior, Ontario.
Other entries included an eclectic range of fillings, including a haggis, neeps and tatties pasty, a pulled pork, sweet potato, shallots and cheddar pasty, and a Mumbai pasty with onion, sweet potato, green peas, cauliflower and undisclosed spices.
Altogether there were more than 200 entries.
The event included comedy and music performances.

Notes

Sources

 

Food and drink festivals in the United Kingdom
Cornish cuisine
Entertainment in Cornwall
2012 establishments in England
St Blazey